Unforgettable Life (also known as Special Operating Room and Illegal Lives) is the first movie concerning premarital pregnancy in China, directed by Tian Zhuangzhuang in 1988. It is reported that this film has been banned for 17 years because of its sensitive topic.

Plot 
A host in television station named Lu Yun has an abortion because she gets pregnant when unmarried, which makes her realize that premarital pregnancy is a very serious social problem. So she decides to make a special report on this problem.

Reception 

This film reflects the opinions of sex of young women in China who are influenced deeply by open and reform in the 1980s. It emphasizes the harm to women caused by premarital pregnancy by referring to some serious problems like sexual harassment, incest, extramarital affairs, love triangles, sexlessness, etc.

References 
http://yule.sohu.com/20050406/n225041506.shtml
http://movie.douban.com/subject/1467830/

External links 

 http://v.youku.com/v_show/id_XMzkzNTk5Mg==.html

Chinese drama films
1988 films
1980s Mandarin-language films